Racconti romani (Roman Tales) is a series of sixty-one short stories written by the Italian author, Alberto Moravia.  Written and published initially in the Italian newspaper, Il Corriere della Sera, they were published as a collection in 1954 by Bompiani.  All of the stories are set in Rome or its surroundings after World War II and focus on 'the common people of Rome' (Roma popolana).  The characters in these stories tend to be the unemployed, ex-convicts, waiters, drivers, con artists, thieves and petty criminals, the average man (or woman) and the lower classes aspiring to climb out of poverty.

All the stories are told in the first person with the narrator often unnamed, although details are usually furnished to provide a clue to the narrator's identity, such as their occupation, motivations and social status.  Moravia's Racconti Romani provide  a snapshot on life in Rome after World War II, revealing much about the inhabitants of Rome in the early 1950s.

Titles of the short stories
Below is a list of the names of the short stories that comprise the Racconti Romani.  Their order is the same presented in volume 3, tome 1 of Alberto Moravia's, Opere, a multi-volume set containing all of Moravia's writings published by Bompiani in 2000:

 Fanatico (The Fanatic)
 Arrivederci
 Pioggia di maggio (Rain in May)
 Non approfondire (Don't Delve Too Deeply . . .)
 La bella serata
 Scherzi del caldo (Hot Weather Jokes)
 La controfigura
 Il pagliaccio (The Clown)
 Il biglietto falso
 Il camionista (The Lorry-Driver)
 Il pensatore
 Scorfani
 Il mediatore (The Go-Between)
 Il pupo (The Baby)
 Il delitto perfetto (The Perfect Crime)
 Il picche nicche
 La voglia di vino
 Prepotente per forza
 Sciupone
 La giornata nera
 I gioielli (Jewellery)
 Tabù (Taboo)
 Io non dico di no (I Don't say no . . .)
 L'inconsciente
 Il provino
 Il pignolo
 La ciociara (The Girl from Ciociaria)
 Impataccato
 Scherzi di ferragosto
 Il terrore di Roma (The Terror of Rome)
 L'amicizia (Friendship)
 La rovina dell'umanità (The Ruin of Humanity)
 Perdipiede
 Vecchio stupido (Silly Old Fool)
 Caterina
 La parola mamma
 Gli occhiali (A Pair of Spectacles)
 Il cane cinese
 Mario (Mario)
 Gli amici senza soldi
 Bu bu bu
 Ladri in chiesa
 Precisamente a te
 Faccia di mascalzone
 Un uomo sfortunato
 Tirato a sorte
 Pigliati un brodo
 La vita in campagna
 Le sue giornate
 La gita
 La rivincita di Tarzan
 Romolo e Remo (Romulus and Remus)
 Faccia da norcino
 L'appetito (Appetite)
 L'infermiera (The Nurse)
 Il tesoro (The Treasure)
 La concorrenza
 Bassetto
 Il guardiano (The Caretaker)
 Il naso (The Nose)
 Il godipoco

In translation
A handful of Moravia's Racconti Romani were published in an English translation, entitled Roman Tales, in 1957 by Farrar, Straus and Cudahy.  Unfortunately, this collection of translated stories is no longer in print but can be found in dozens of libraries worldwide or on the used book market.

In print
Moravia's Racconti Romani are still in print and are available from Bompiani as part of the mult-volume set, Opere, published in 2000.  The stories themselves were republished in 2001 from Bompiani, entitled Racconti Romani.  Both editions are currently in print.

Radio broadcasts
Ten of Moravia's Racconti Romani were converted into radio broadcasts by RAI television in 1959 (see link below to Romolo e Remo).  With the advent of audiobooks, several Italian publishing entities have released audiobooks of these short stories.

Pioggia di Maggio
Romolo e Remo

Film adaptations
Moravia's Racconti Romani has been adapted into film three times.  The first, in 1954, in the film Too Bad She's Bad directed by Alessandro Blasetti with Sophia Loren and Marcello Mastroianni, adapting the story, Fanatico. Moravia's stories were used again in 1955 under director Gianni Franciolini starring Totò, Vittorio De Sica, and Giovanna Ralli, entitled Racconti Romani.  A third film, La giornata balorda, filmed in 1960 and directed by Mauro Bolognini, also borrowed from Moravia's stories.

Criticism and interpretation 
Below is a list of invaluable sources about Moravia's Racconti Romani—all are in Italian unless otherwise noted:
 Camilucci, Marcello. "Roma e i "Racconti romani" di Moravia",  Studi romani, 6:5 (1958:sett./ott.) p. 547-561
 Lauta, Gianluca. La scrittura di Moravia: lingua e stile dagli Indifferenti ai Racconti romani. Comunicazione e scienze umane, 1. Milano: F. Angeli, 2005.
 Moravia, Alberto, and Piero Cudini. Racconti romani. Tascabili Bompiani. Milano: Bompiani, 2005. (especially introduction by Piero Cudini)
 Moravia, Alberto, Rocco Capozzi, and Mario B. Mignone. Homage to Moravia. Filibrary Series, no. 5. Stony Brook, NY: Forum Italicum, 1993.

References

External links
"Racconti Romani"
 Racconti Romani

Alberto Moravia
Italian short story collections
1954 short story collections
Rome in fiction